The Schaumburg Municipal Helistop is a public-use heliport located in and owned by the Village of Schaumburg, Illinois. Established in 1989, Schaumburg was the first Chicago suburb with a public-use heliport.

The facility has one landing area, designated H1, whose dimensions are 25 x 25 ft (8 x 8 m). The heliport also has a 12 ft x 25 ft parking area. The landing area is protected by a 100 f 115 ft perimeter.

For the 12-month period ending May 31, 2021, the airport has 67 aircraft operations per month, or about 800 per year. It consists entirely of transient general aviation. For that same time period, no aircraft are based at the heliport.

The Village of Schaumburg also maintains the Schaumburg Regional Airport, a separate facility capable of handling fixed-wing aircraft and those that cannot take off or land vertically.

References 

Airports in Illinois